Route nationale 24  (RN 24) is a secondary, unpaved highway in Madagascar of 61 km, running from Manajary to Vohilava. It crosses the region of Vatovavy.

Selected locations on route
(East to West)
Mananjary- (junction with RN11
Sahavary
Ambodimangakely
Vohilava

References 

Roads in Madagascar
Roads in Vatovavy